The Ballislife All-American Game is an annual American all-star game featuring high school basketball players. It was founded in 2011 by Ballislife.com to provide a stage for West Coast players who were not selected to other All-American games. At the time, few players from the region were selected for the McDonald's All-American Game in Chicago or the Jordan Brand Classic in New York. Over time, the Ballislife game evolved to include top players throughout the nation.

A slam dunk contest is also held in conjunction with the game.

Game results

Game MVPs
Following are the most valuable players (MVP) from each year:

Slam dunk champions
Zach LaVine won the dunk contest in 2013, and used the same moves as a professional to win the Slam Dunk Contest during the 2015 NBA All-Star Weekend.

Year-by-year rosters

2011

Navy Team
Tyrell Corbin
Amir Garrett
Thomas Gipson
Cezar Guerrero
Jarion Henry
Jalen Jones
Byron Wesley
Jordan Williams
Collin Woods

White Team
Devonta Abron
Juan Anderson
Jamal Branch
Jabari Brown
Jahii Carson
Angelo Chol
Jordan Green
Nick Johnson
Keaton Miles
Ike Nwamu
Wesley Saunders
Greg Sequele

Top scorer: Jalen Jones (Navy), 25
Top rebounder: Amir Garrett (Navy), 9
Most assists: Cezar Guerrero (Navy), 7

2012

Black Team
Dominic Artis
Ben Carter
Charles Hill
Anthony January
Glenn Robinson III
Matt Shrigley
Skylar Spencer
Nick Stover
Gabe York

White Team
Jordan Adams
Rosco Allen
Prince Ibeh
Jordan Loveridge
Langston Morris-Walker
Katin Reinhardt
Victor Robbins
Tyrone Wallace
Demetris Morant

Top scorer: Jordan Loveridge (White), 26
Top rebounder: Prince Ibeh (Black), 14
Most assists: Dominic Artis (Black), 10

2013

Blue Team
Malcolm Allen
Marcus Allen
Jordan Bell
Deonte Burton
Aquille Carr
Derrick Griffin
Isaac Hamilton
Jaron Hopkins
Tim Myles
Christian Wood
Kris Yanku

White Team
Payton Banks
Elijah Brown
Stevie Clark
Julian Jacobs
Jack Karapetyan
Zach LaVine
Khleem Perkins
Roschon Prince
Brandon Randolph
Dustin Thomas
Paul Watson

Top scorer: Jordan Bell (Blue), 22
Top rebounder: Jordan Bell (Blue), 16
Most assists: 4 players tied, 3

2014

Black Team
Shaqquan Aaron
Cliff Alexander
Isaiah Bailey
Keita Bates-Diop
Gary Clark Jr
Isaac Copeland
Daniel Hamilton
Ahmed Hill
Alex Robinson
Tyler Ulis

Red Team
Leron Black
Chris Chiozza
Trevor Dunbar
Stanley Johnson
Terry Larrier
Kevon Looney
Jordan McLaughlin
Namon Wright

Top scorer: Stanley Johnson (Red), 39
Top rebounder: Stanley Johnson (Red), 12
Most assists: Tyler Ulis (Black), 10

2015

Gray Team
Jalen Adams
Malik Beasley
Marquese Chriss
Chance Comanche
Thon Maker
Chimezie Metu
Donovan Mitchell
Rex Pflueger
Corey Sanders
Justin Simon
Kendall Small

Orange Team
Paris Austin
Dwayne Bacon
Bennie Boatwright
Isaiah Briscoe
Tyler Dorsey
Jeremy Hemsley
Derrick Jones Jr.
Skal Labissière
Dejounte Murray
Horace Spencer
Stephen Thompson Jr.

Top scorer: Isaiah Briscoe (Orange), 22
Top rebounder: Skal Labissière (Orange), 15
Most assists: Jalen Adams and Justin Simon (Gray), 5

2016

Black Team
Rawle Alkins
Lonzo Ball
Troy Baxter Jr.
Miles Bridges
Yoeli Childs
Sam Cunliffe
Markus Howard
Dewan Huell
T. J. Leaf
Kwe Parker

White Team
Ike Anigbogu
James Banks
Marques Bolden
J. J. Caldwell
Terrance Ferguson
Mustapha Heron
Vance Jackson
Andrew Jones
Mitch Lightfoot
Cassius Winston

Top scorer: Mustapha Heron (White), 33
Top rebounder: T. J. Leaf (Black), 10
Most assists: Andrew Jones (White), 14

2017

Blue Team
Mohamed Bamba
Quade Green
Jalen Hill
Ira Lee
Charles O'Bannon Jr.
KZ Okpala
Collin Sexton
Ethan Thompson
Isaiah Washington
P. J. Washington
Kris Wilkes

White Team
LiAngelo Ball
Brian Bowen
Trevon Duval
Savion Flagg
Jaylen Hands
Chris Lykes
Brandon McCoy
Brandon Randolph
Eli Scott
Trae Young

Top scorer: Brandon McCoy (White) and Ethan Thompson (Blue), 30
Top rebounder: Brandon McCoy (White) and Isaiah Washington (Blue), 10
Most assists: Eli Scott (White), 7

2018

Black Team
James Akinjo
Kaden Archie
Jules Bernard
Matt Bradley
Teashon Cherry
Talen Horton-Tucker
Mac McClung
Shareef O'Neal
Javonte Smart
Coby White
Emmitt Williams

White Team
Moses Brown
Devon Dotson
Nassir Little
Jordan McCabe
Luther Muhammad
Miles Norris
Naz Reid
Kevin Porter Jr.
David Singleton
Duane Washington
Brandon Williams

Top scorer: Emmitt Williams (Black), 31
Top rebounder: Emmitt Williams (Black), 12
Most assists: Jordan McCabe (White), 6

2019
Source

Team Elite
Terry Armstrong
Anthony Edwards
Niven Glover
Jaelen House
Jaime Jaquez Jr.
E. J. Liddell
Tre Mann
Mario McKinney
Onyeka Okongwu
Jahmi'us Ramsey
Cassius Stanley
Trendon Watford

Team Future
Precious Achiuwa
D. J. Carton
Boogie Ellis
Scottie Lewis
Kenyon Martin Jr.
Tyrese Maxey
Isaiah Mobley
Isaac Okoro
Scotty Pippen Jr.
Drew Timme
Rocket Watts

Top scorer: Isaiah Mobley (Team Future), 33
Top rebounder: Jaime Jaquez Jr. (Team Elite), 8
Most assists: Boogie Ellis and Isaiah Mobley (Team Future), 7

References

External links

Basketball all-star games
Basketball competitions in California
High school basketball games in the United States
Recurring sporting events established in 2011
2011 establishments in California